The Korbut flip is a gymnastics skill performed on either of two different apparatus. Both were first performed internationally by the Soviet gymnast Olga Korbut.

The more spectacular version of the skill used to be performed on the uneven bars, where the gymnast, from a stand on the high bar, performs a back flip and regrasps the bar. Korbut performed the move at the 1972 Summer Olympics, where it was the first backward release move performed on the uneven bars in international competition. In 1977, Soviet gymnast Elena Mukhina modified the flip by adding a full twist. The movement was later modified in the 1980s when it was performed towards the low bar; that is, the gymnast's flip takes place above the low bar. The Code of Points was later modified to ban standing on the high bar during routines. 

The skill is also performed on the balance beam. The move is performed from a standing position and is landed in a straddled position on the beam. This movement has been modified to include twists and piked or tucked legs and is frequently performed in sequence with other movements. Unlike its counterpart on the uneven bars, the Korbut flip on beam is today considered a relatively simple skill, valued at only a "B" level in the 2017 Code of Points.

Other gymnasts who have performed the skill's uneven bars variation include Radka Zemanova (1980), Steffi Kraker (1977), Emily May (1981), Lyubov Bogdanova (1974) and Natalia Shaposhnikova (1976).

References

External links
Olga Korbut Uneven Bars with Korbut Flip slow motion Video, 1972 Olympics

Gymnastics elements